Alexander M. Schmidt (January 26, 1930 – January 28, 1991) was an American physician who served as Commissioner of Food and Drugs from 1973 to 1976.

He died of coronary artery disease on January 28, 1991, in Oak Park, Illinois, at age 61.

References

1930 births
1991 deaths
20th-century American physicians
Commissioners of the Food and Drug Administration
Nixon administration personnel
Ford administration personnel